Leptobarbus melanotaenia the Bornean Sultan Fish is a species of ray-finned fish in the genus Leptobarbus from freshwater habitats in Borneo. It is one of the most preferred food fish to be caught by the communities there.

Local names 

 Called Hanyan by the Merap community
 Called Sayen by the Kenyah community
 Called Anyen by the Punan community

Description 
The standard body length is 34 cm, but sexual maturity can be reached at 29 cm. The distinguishing feature of the species is the occurrence of a black mid-lateral line running along the lateral line, similar to L. rubripinna. However, unlike L. rubripinna, this black line does not fade or disappear as the fish reaches maturity.

Ecology 
Feed primarily on aquatic plants, leaf litter, fallen fruit and seeds.

References 

melanotaenia
Fish described in 1894
Freshwater fish of Southeast Asia